Poco Lena (1949–1968) was an outstanding cutting mare, and dam of two famous Quarter horse cutting horses and stallions: Doc O'Lena and Dry Doc.

Life

Poco Lena was foaled in 1949, the daughter of Poco Bueno out of a daughter of Pretty Boy named Sheilwin.  She traced to Peter McCue on both her sire's and her dam's side.

Career, breeding and honors 
With the American Quarter Horse Association (or AQHA) Poco Lena earned her AQHA Championship, a Performance Register of Merit, a Superior Cutting Horse award and a Superior Halter Horse award. She was also the AQHA High Point Cutting Horse in 1959, 1960, and 1961. With the National Cutting Horse Association (or NCHA) she earned a total of $99,819.61 in cutting contests in her career. She earned a Certificate of Ability, as well as a Bronze and a Silver Award with the NCHA. She was also inducted into the NCHA Horse Hall of Fame.

In late 1961, Poco Lena foundered. She recovered, and was showing well when in October 1962 her owner, B. A. Skipper Jr., died in a plane crash. In the confusion, Poco Lena was left in a trailer for four days without food or water. She foundered again, and never competed again. Eventually she was bought by the owners of Doc Bar, Dr. and Mrs. Stephen Jensen. After much nursing and effort, Poco Lena produced two foals when bred to Doc Bar – Doc O'Lena and Dry Doc, both of whom won the NCHA Cutting Futurity. However, Poco Lena's founder deteriorated after the birth of Dry Doc, and on December 16, 1968, she was euthanized.

Poco Lena was inducted into the AQHA Hall of Fame.

Pedigree

Notes

References

 All Breed Pedigree Database Pedigree for Poco Lena retrieved on June 26, 2007
 AQHA Hall of Fame accessed on September 2, 2017
 NCHA Horse Hall of Fame retrieved on September 4, 2017
 
 Poco Lena NCHA Earnings retrieved on September 4, 2017

External links
 Poco Lena at Quarter Horse Directory
 Poco Lena at Quarter Horse Legends

Cutting horses
American Quarter Horse broodmares
1949 animal births
1968 animal deaths
Individual mares
AQHA Hall of Fame (horses)